The Aptera solar electric vehicle (sEV) is a two-seat, three-wheeled vehicle under development by the crowd-funded relaunched company, Aptera Motors. The Aptera’s declared primary design goal is to be the world’s most energy efficient vehicle in mass production. The design features an aerodynamic shape, the use of lightweight carbon fiber and fiberglass composite materials, wheel hub motors, and built-in solar panels to significantly extend its range.

The Aptera sEV has received much media attention and garnered over 40,000 reservations, but has been plagued with years of production delays and funding problems.

Efficiency as a primary design goal 
The Aptera’s declared primary design goal is to be the most energy efficient highway capable passenger vehicle ever produced.

The company claims its calculations and simulations show the production Aptera will require less than 100 Watt-hours (Wh) of energy per mile on the EPA combined city and highway test cycle. This would make it about 2.5 times as energy efficient as the 2022 Tesla Model 3’s efficiency of 255 Wh per mile.

The company explains Aptera's efficiency has been obtained by combining two factors: a low drag aerodynamic shape and lightweight materials such as the carbon fiber and fiberglass resin composite materials used in its body panels. The company states it optimized the automobile drag coefficient to 0.13 via simulated fluid dynamic calculations, a number significantly lower than any production motorcycle or car.

The Aptera's body shape is similar to earlier design exercises in efficiency, including the "Fusion" human-powered vehicle produced by the Pegasus Research Company in 1984, and the MIT Aztec Solar Car, which won multiple efficiency awards while racing in the American Tour de Sol in 1993.

Low drag cooling system 
Aptera's cooling system design will also aid in reducing drag and weight. Traditional radiators with fans add drag and weight to most vehicles, including BEVs. Aptera's designers found a way to radiate the vehicle's heat without using a traditional drag-inducing radiator: the Aptera's smooth aluminum underside will work as a radiator containing coolant filled channels to transfer heat from the batteries, air conditioner, heat pump and motors to the underbelly of the vehicle.

Solar Charging 

The company claims that the full solar package, with solar panels on the roof, hood, dashboard and hatch, was calculated to produce almost 700 watts of power. That would be enough to charge the battery with 4.0 kWh in ideal conditions of a sunny long Summer day. At 10 miles per kWh this will add up to 40 miles of range per day in the Sun. Since most drivers drive less than 30 miles per day, this feature will allow most drivers to seldom need to plug in to charge the batteries. Thus the Aptera was at promoted as the world's first "Never Charge" EV. 

The company's web site includes a solar calculator that allows users to estimate how much money they'll save driving an Aptera based on their location and annual driving distances.

The custom, 2 dimensionally curved solar panels will be manufactured by Aptera Motors from cells made by Maxeon Solar Technologies.

AC and DC Charging 
The Aptera will also be able to charge from standard 120 and 240-volt AC outlets using standard EV Level 1 and Level 2 charging station equipment. Aptera Co-CEO Chris Anthony also stated that the vehicle will also accept high speed charges from CCS DC chargers. 

In December 2020 Aptera Motors revealed the Aptera solar-powered prototype which included a photo showing what appeared to be a Tesla Supercharger shaped connector being plugged into the Aptera's charging port. In July, 2022, the company started promoting the idea of making the Tesla charging station plug a US standard, making it eligible for US charging infrastructure grants. Then in November Tesla announced it was revising and opening its proprietary charging system to all, naming it the North American Charging Standard (NACS) using a Tesla compatible connector and the CCS signaling protocol. A few weeks later Aptera confirmed it would use the newly opened Tesla NACS system and had selected Lectron EV as its EV charging equipment supplier.

Motors and performance 
The Aptera website allows customers to place a reservation for an Aptera with either two or three wheel hub motors for front-wheel drive or all-wheel drive. Aptera announced the in-wheel electric motors will be provided by Elaphe Propulsion Technologies Ltd., a small company based in Slovakia.

Originally the selected motors were each capable of 50 kW (67 horsepower).  The motors were later optimized for better efficiency at highway speeds, lowering the power rating to 42 kW (57 horsepower). The optimized motors have a claimed capability to accelerate the two motor production version of Aptera from 0-60 mph in 6 seconds, and the three motor version in 4 seconds. Both versions will be RPM speed limited to allow the Aptera to reach a top speed of 101 mph.

Lightweight composite body 
Aptera's body will contain very little metal. The majority of the body will be made from molded Carbon Fiber Sheet Molding Compound (CF-SMC), combined with fiberglass Sheet Molding Compound (SMC). 

Carbon Fiber Sheet Molding Compound is a lightweight composite material consisting of a random arrangement of short fibers that make it possible to mold intricately shaped parts.
  
Aptera announced it has signed an agreement with the C.P.C. Group of Modena, Italy to produce its composite bodies, a company specialized in composites and mechanical engineering solutions in the automotive world.

Size

Configurations 

Solar panel, motor and battery configurations options are being offered as reservation preferences, with estimated prices ranging from a base price of $25,900 for a 2 motor 25 kWh battery, 250 mile range version, to over $47,000 for a 3 motor 100 kWh, 1000 mile range version with all the available options.

In September 2020, two front-wheel drive (FWD) limited editions were announced:
 The Paradigm Edition: "The Most Efficient Vehicle on the Road" with a 400-mile range, 100kW drive system, and all solar panels (220 vehicles – first production run, total price: $29,900)
 The Paradigm +: "The Most Efficient Long Range Vehicle on the Road" with a full 1,000-mile range, 100kW drive system, and all solar panels (110 vehicles – fourth production run, total price: $44,900)

On January 20, 2023, the company announced changed specifications for their first available vehicle, the "Launch Edition". With this announcement, the first 5000 or so produced vehicles would all have 3 wheel drive and the full 700 watt solar package. With a 6.6 kW internal charger, the initial Aptera will be designed to charge at up to 57 mph on a Level 2 (240 volt AC) charger and 13 mph on a Level 1 (120 volt AC) charger through common Tesla defined NACS charge ports. Three days later they confirmed that the Launch Edition vehicles will also include DC fast charging capability in the range of 40 to 60 kW, equivalent to adding 40 to 60 miles every 6 minutes.

The company’s stated plan is that other battery options will be manufactured only after the Launch Edition run of 5000 or so has been completed. After that manufacturing for the 250 mile version will commence, followed by the 600 mile version with a redesigned battery, and finally the 1000 mile version will enter manufacturing, also with a redesigned battery. Detailed designs for the 600 and 1000 mile batteries have not been done at the time of this writing.

Listed Options 

The following options were made available on the Aptera reservation page. However the company has made it clear that some and perhaps all options would not be available at customer launch time.
 "SafetyPilot" — adds SAE Level 2 autonomy capability, including facial tracking, lane keeping, adaptive cruise control, and emergency braking,
 Enhanced audio — provides three more channels of audio including an added lightweight transmission-line subwoofer,
 Off-road kit — increases ground clearance and provides tougher wheel covers,
 Camping kit — provides an integrated tent and rear awning,
 Pet kit — adds a pet divider, a way to secure a pet, a rear ladder and other accessories for an animal.

Projected availability, a history of delays 
In October 2019, the company announced the first prototypes of the Aptera sEV were planned for the first quarter of 2020. 

In February 2020 the company announced it had raised enough funding to see the solar EV into production. The plan was to build and test development vehicles through the 3rd quarter of 2020, then move from development into production by the end of 2020. 

In September 2020, Aptera published on their WeFunder investment page an investor presentation showing planned first customer availability in Q2 of 2021.

The company revealed their first prototype of the solar-powered vehicle and started accepting "pre-orders" on December 4, 2020. The same day Anthony wrote, "Delivery for early orders is end of 2021". The next month he added, "If we can raise funds effectively and COVID doesn't continue to be a significant impediment we should be able to deliver 4 to 6 thousand units in 2022." However, COVID did cause further delays in getting parts for the prototypes and getting the prototypes built.

In a December 2021 video update, the company revealed they had started construction in their newly acquired 80,000 square foot factory space and were "confident we will be able to begin supplying vehicles in the later part of 2022." 

A month later in January 2022 the San Diego Business Journal quoted Anthony as saying, "The company is wrapping up testing its Beta model and has been working on its Gamma design for the last six months.  Once testing on the Gamma is done, Aptera will build its preproduction Delta model that will have most of the car’s components, like a complete interior, airbags and air conditioning."

Five months later a webinar was hosted by Aptera Motors in which they outlined the company's progress. At this webinar the team announced the completion of its Gamma prototype design and was aiming to complete its build of the first Gamma prototype in about 4 to 6 weeks. After that, the Delta pre-production prototype design "will take several more months" to complete. First customer delivery was still aiming for "the end of the year". They also said they plan to produce 1,000 vehicles in the first few months of production. Those first 1,000 vehicles would all be that 400-mile range version. First deliveries will be made to customers most local to their headquarters in San Diego, California.

Later in a video published in August 2022 by the Fully Charged Show, Anthony stated, "We are looking to produce our first production-intent vehicle by the end of the year and then scale production in 2023." Anthony also stated that pre-orders had grown to 27,000.

Then a press release dated November 3rd, 2022 stated in part, "Aptera aims to begin deliveries in 2023 and ramp up to a full-scale production rate of 40 vehicles per day".

However in January 2023 the company revealed that it's new plan for mass production needed more funds to purchase the tooling and equipment needed to start production. They announced new fund raising campaigns and announced they could start production 12 months after $50 million in needed funds were raised. This delayed first customer availability to 2024 at the earliest.

Additional Controversy 
Commentators early on expressed skepticism whether 100 kWh of Lithium battery modules would fit within the confines of the Aptera’s body as shown. The company has not revealed how they expect to do that other than to state that they will use a different battery type for their higher mileage (60 and 100 kWh) versions, and the 100 kWh version may need to have a slightly expanded body.

Commentators have also pointed out the range and acceleration numbers have yet to be demonstrated by any of the 3 generations of (partially) operational prototypes built.

Commentators have also pointed out that the announced prices haven’t been updated in the years since they were first announced and will likely be increased due to the years of inflation since they were announced.

See also
Aptera 2 Series
Arcimoto
Commuter Cars Tango
Lightyear 0 solar powered car
Microlino
Nobe GT100

References 

Electric concept cars
Proposed vehicles
Solar-powered vehicles
Electric three-wheel vehicles
All-wheel-drive vehicles
Electric motorcycles
Cars introduced in 2019